Cunningham is an unincorporated community in Floyd County, in the U.S. state of Georgia.

History
Variant names were "Cunningham Station" and "Agate". A post office called Cunningham's Station was established in 1870, closed in 1874, reopened as Agate in 1881, and closed permanently in 1933. In 1900, the community had 53 inhabitants.

References

Unincorporated communities in Floyd County, Georgia
Unincorporated communities in Georgia (U.S. state)